Adorama Camera, Inc is a camera, electronics, and film equipment retailer launched in 1974. Apart from their online shopping websites (Adorama, Sunny Sports, Leisure Pro, Scuba.com, PRINTIQUE) they have a large multi-floor Chelsea store, which is located at 42 West, 18th Street, New York City, New York.

History

The business was founded by Mendel Mendlowits in 1974 with the goal to help out amateurs, hobbyists, and professionals in the photography community. With the goal of creating a business that was more than just a camera store, Adorama was set up to be an all-around resource for professional photographers in the news, modeling, and print industries, with helpful and knowledgeable staff members who "care about your images as much as you do." Adorama also went on to establish its own photo lab, offer equipment rental, and run workshops through the Adorama Learning Center. By 2005, Adorama opened a warehouse in New Jersey.

Brands
Adorama Rental Co.

The company’s brand of rental services, Adorama Rental Co., was founded in 1988. It had multiple departments dedicated to renting out a wide range of equipment, from TV production, studio, and cinematography equipment to cameras. Short-term rentals were allowed and customers could have the items picked up or delivered nationwide.

The store also established a Used Equipment Department where customers can purchase used merchandise or trade in their old equipment in exchange for cash or credit.

AdoramaPix

In 1997, Adorama launched a photo printing and Flash-based photo book service via its sister website AdoramaPix, which allows users to create and customize their own hardcover photo book online for home delivery.

By 2014, AdoramaPix had expanded their operations by moving to a larger in-house photo lab—a 20,000+ sq. ft. photo production and printing facility in Brooklyn, New York. According to the Director of AdoramaPix, Herman Klein, the move to the bigger production house enabled “AdoramaPix to multiply our production capacity” and add "new features and services, including more options for custom cover books and same day shipping."

In 2020, AdoramaPix rebranded as Printique.

Adorama Learning Center

Adorama initially offered in-store workshops to help educate and share content with other members of the photography community.  the company moved their educational efforts online by establishing the Adorama Academy (now known as the award-winning Adorama Learning Center). The ALC hosts free and paid workshops, and features informative blog posts on the adorama.com home page.

The Adorama Learning Center also offers reviews and how-to videos related to photography, videography, and professional audio on their Youtube channel, AdoramaTV, which has nearly 90 million views since it was launched in February 2010. It has since featured resource material about photography, music, and film, as well as a number of original web series such as “Through the Lens,” “Exploring Photography with Mark Wallace,” “Breathe Your Passion with Vanessa Joy,” and the reality web series contest, “Top Photographer with Nigel Barker,” which aired in the fall of 2016.

Adorama Business Solutions

In 2017, the company launched its business-to-business division, Adorama Business Solutions (ABS). The organization offers a range of commercial services such as consultations, procurement assistance, and technical and support services from pre-sale through post-sale for studios, broadcasters, networks, and educational and government institutions.

References

External links
 
 Adorama Learning Center
 Adorama TV Youtube Channel

Photographic retailers
Retail companies established in 1975
Companies based in Manhattan
Shops in New York City
Consumer electronics retailers in the United States
Midtown Manhattan
Photography companies of the United States